Adhémar Schwitzguébel (August 15, 1844, in Sonvilier – July 23, 1895, Evilard) was a Swiss anarchist, theorist of collectivist anarchism, founder of the Jura Federation, and member of the First International.

Works 
 Schwitzguébel, Adhemar:Quelques écrits. Paris 1906th Edited by James Guillaume. (fr. edition of 1908)

Further reading 
 Mario Vuilleumier. Horlogers de l'anarchisme. Payot, Lausanne 1988
 Guillaume, J. L'Internationale: doc. et souvenirs. 4 vol., 1905–1910 (reprinted 1980–1985).
 Vuilleumier, M. "Le socialisme libertaire en Suisse romande: un texte inconnu d'Adhémar Schwitzguébel, 1872" in Cah. Vilfredo Pareto, 1969, no 18, 161–176.
 Lörtscher, Ch. Vereinigt euch!: Adhémar Schwitzguébels Leben für die Arbeiterbewegung. 2007.

External links 

1844 births
1895 deaths
Swiss anarchists
Deaths from cancer in Switzerland
Jura Federation